Xylophanes obscurus is a moth of the  family Sphingidae.

Distribution 
It is known from Peru and Brazil.

Description 
It is similar to Xylophanes cosmius  but the forewing upperside is darker, more uniform and sombre brown. Furthermore, the dark patch distal to discal spot is larger and trapezoidal. The conspicuous postmedian line is straight or slightly convex, reaching the costa before the apex. The fringes are not chequered.

Biology 
There are probably at least three generations per year.

The larvae probably feed on Rubiaceae and Malvaceae species.

References

obscurus
Moths described in 1910